IV is the fourth studio album by Maylene and the Sons of Disaster. It was released September 27, 2011. The first single released from the album was 'In Dead We Dream', through the Revolver Magazine website, on August 4, 2011. On August 15, 2011, Alternative Press released a new single by Maylene and the Sons of Disaster entitled 'Open Your Eyes' through their website. Sept. 26, 2011, AOL began streaming the album via their website.

Track listing
"In Dead We Dream" – 3:16
"Save Me" – 4:00
"Faith Healer (Bring Me Down)" – 3:37
"Open Your Eyes" – 3:15
"Killing Me Slow" – 4:04
"Taking On Water" – 4:05
"Fate Games" – 2:16
"Come For You" – 3:59
"Never Enough" – 2:51
"Cat's Walk" – 2:37
"Drought of '85" – 4:11
"Off To The Laughing Place" – 3:27

Deluxe and 'limited' editions
Deluxe Editions of IV are available through iTunes and Amazon MP3. The Deluxe Edition includes 1 new song and 1 remix:
<li> "Carry Us Away" - 2:46
<li> "Save Me (High Top Kicks Remix)" - 5:47

The "Limited" Edition is a signed copy of the non-Deluxe album. This was only available to the first 500 pre-orders through MerchNOW.

Personnel
Maylene & The Sons of Disaster
 Dallas Taylor - vocals, acoustic guitar on "Off to the Laughing Place"
 Chad Huff - lead guitar
 Jake Duncan - guitar, vocals
 Brad Lehmann - bass
 Miles McPherson - drums, percussion

Production
Brian Virtue - Producer
Rob Graves - Co-Producer
Forefathers Group - Artwork

References

2011 albums
04